The Throne of Fire is a 1983 Italian film directed by Franco Prosperi. The film is among the peplums of the 1980s to feature a woman as the central character, along with Red Sonja,  Hundra and Barbarian Queen.

Production
Parts of Throne of Fire were shot at Bracciano in Rome with interiors shot at De Paolis Studios and Elios studios in Rome.
The film reuses the village raid sequence from the 1982 film Barbarian Master.

Release
The Throne of Fire was released on 17 June 1983 in Italy and on 5 June 1986 in the United States.

Reception
In his overview of 1980s action films, Daniel R. Budnik described the film as a "Conan rip-off from Italy" that was closer to "peplum from the late 1950s" and had a similar "meandering feel" that the films of that era had.

References

Footnotes

Sources

External links
 

Peplum films
Films scored by Carlo Rustichelli
Sword and sandal films
Films shot in Rome
Films directed by Franco Prosperi
1980s Italian films